Wissem Bouzid (born 18 December 2002) is a footballer who plays as a forward for the Algeria women's national football team and a midfielder for French club US Orléans.

Club career
Bouzid started playing football for the youth teams of Paris Saint-Germain. before joining US Orléans in 2021.

International career
In October 2021, she was called up for the Algerian team for the first time by national coach Radia Fertoul, to participate in a double confrontation against Sudan, as part of the 2022 Women's Africa Cup of Nations qualification. On October 20, 2021, she marked her first cap as a starter and scored a brace in the historic 14–0 win over Sudan. The return match scheduled for October 26 was canceled following the October–November 2021 Sudanese coup d'état.

Career statistics

Club

Scores and results list Algeria's goal tally first, score column indicates score after each Bouzid goal.

References

2002 births
Living people
Algerian women's footballers
Algeria women's international footballers
Women's association football forwards
French women's footballers
US Orléans players
Division 2 Féminine players
Sportspeople from Seine-Saint-Denis
French sportspeople of Algerian descent